Mohsin Naqvi (10 May 1947 − 15 January 1996) was a Pakistani poet, known for his ghazals.

Early life 
Naqvi was born on 10 May 1947 in Dera Ghazi Khan, Punjab, British India (now in Pakistan). His father, Syed Chirag Hussain Shah, was a saddlemaker and food vendor. His parents named him Ghulam Abbas which he later changed to Ghulam Abbas Mohsin Naqvi. Naqvi had six siblings.  

He graduated from Government College Multan and earned his master's degree from the University of the Punjab, Lahore.

Career 
He became known as the Poet of Ahl-e-bait. His poetry about the Karbla is recited all over Pakistan. 

He was an active member of Shia Muslim community, which is believed to be the reason behind his assassination. Naqvi published books of poetry during his lifetime. He gained a title of "Iqbal e Sani". He studied the basics of poetry from Rafiq Khawar Jaskani, a poet, in Dera Ghazi Khan.

His poetry included the love of Alif Laila type. He also wrote against the Rulers of the world who don't care their people.  He wrote a geet "lahron ki tarah tujhko bikharne nahi denge" 
لہروں کی طرح تُجھ کو  بکھرنے نہیں دیں گے for Baza-e-Husn and won the best film award.

Death 
He was murdered on 15 January 1996 at Lahore in the main Bazar. His funeral prayer was led by Tehreek Nafaz Fiqh-e-Jafariya, Chief Allama Agha Syed Hamid Ali Shah Moosavi at Nasir Bagh, Lahore. His body was moved to his birth home Block 45 Dera Ghazi Khan where he was laid to rest in the presence of thousands. Mohsin Naqvi's grave in Karbala Shreef Dera Ghazi Khan. His last words were:

le zindagi ka khums Ali(a.s) k ghulam seAy  maout  aa  zaroor  magar ahtraam  seAashiq hon agr zara bhi aziyat hui mujhyshikwa kron ga tera main apne Imam(a.s) se -

Publications 
A partial list of Urdu poetry books of Naqvi:

 Azaab-e-Deed عذابِ دید
 Khaima-e-Jaan خَیمۂِ جاں
 Berg-e-Sehra برگِ صِحرا
 Band-e-Kbaa بندِ قبا
 Mauj-e-idraak مَوجِ ادراک
 Tulu-e-ashk طُلُوعِ اشک
 Furat-e-fikr فُراتِ فکر
 Reza-e-harf ریزۂِ حرف
 Rakht-e-shab رختِ شب
 Rida-e-khaab رِدائے خواب
 Haq-e-Aeliya حقِ ایلیا

See also 
 List of Pakistani poets

References

External links 
 Poetry of Mohsin Naqvi 

1947 births
1996 deaths
People from Dera Ghazi Khan District
Punjabi-language poets
Urdu-language poets from Pakistan
University of the Punjab alumni
20th-century poets
Government Emerson College alumni
Zakir Hussain (musician) albums